The 2011 Mackay Cutters season was the fourth in the club's history. Coached by Anthony Seibold and captained by Grant Rovelli, they competed in the QRL's Intrust Super Cup. The club missed the finals in 2011, finishing the season in ninth.

Season summary
The Cutters entered the 2011 season with a new head coach after Paul Bramley, who led the club to their first finals series in 2010, left the club to join the Burleigh Bears. He was replaced by former Canberra Raiders and London Broncos prop Anthony Seibold. Seibold was an assistant at the Celtic Crusaders from 2006 to 2009 and head coach of the South Wales Scorpions, helping them gain promotion in 2010. The club's biggest recruit for the season was former New Zealand Warriors and North Queensland Cowboys halfback Grant Rovelli, who was named captain of the side.

The Cutters endured a horror injury run in 2011, having to use 43 different players during the season, and finished ninth on the ladder. Lewis Balcomb, a new recruit from Souths Logan, was named the club's Player of the Year, while Rovelli was selected for the Queensland Residents side. The club began playing out of their new home ground, Stadium Mackay, late in the 2011 season.

Squad List

2011 squad

The following players contracted to the North Queensland Cowboys played for the Cutters in 2011: Isaak Ah Mau, Leeson Ah Mau, Clint Amos, Sam Foster, Shannon Gallant, Dane Hogan, Ben Jones, Tyson Martin, Dylan Smith and Will Tupou.

Squad movement

Gains

Losses

Fixtures

Regular season

Statistics

Honours

Club
Player of the Year: Lewis Balcomb
Sponsor's Player of the Year: Jardine Bobongie
Rookie of the Year: Bureta Faraimo
Club Person of the Year: Tony Gambie

References

2011 in Australian rugby league
2011 in rugby league by club
Mackay Cutters